Solar power in Arizona has the potential to, according to then-Governor Janet Napolitano, make Arizona "the Persian Gulf of solar energy". In 2012, Arizona had 1,106 MW of photovoltaic (PV) solar power systems, and 6 MW of concentrated solar power (CSP), bringing the total to over 1,112 megawatts (MW) of solar power. As an example, the Solana Generating Station, a 280 MW parabolic trough solar plant, when commissioned in 2013, was the largest parabolic trough plant in the world and the first U.S. solar plant with molten salt thermal energy storage.

A Renewable Portfolio Standard set by the Arizona Corporation Commission requires 15% renewable energy by 2025 among regulated utilities, 4.5% of which must come from distributed renewable energy sources.

History

The first commercial solar power system in the state was a 95 kilowatt (kW) single-axis tracking photovoltaic plant in Flagstaff, Arizona, opened in October 1997 and operated by Arizona Public Service (APS). In 1999, the city of Scottsdale covered an  parking lot with photovoltaic panels, to both provide shaded parking, and generate 93 kW of solar power. In 2001 APS and Embry-Riddle Aeronautical University constructed a 190 kW single-axis tracking photovoltaic power plant.

In 2001, the Springerville Generating Station Solar System was built by Tucson Electric Power, one of the first large scale photovoltaic power stations. Originally 4.6 MW, it has been expanded to 6.4 MW. In 2002, Love Field Airport, in Prescott, Arizona, began construction of a 5 megawatt (MW) photovoltaic power plant. By July 2006, it had a peak capacity of 2.879 MWAC.

The two operating concentrated solar power plants are the 1 MW Saguaro Solar Power Plant completed in 2005, the first commercial CSP plant of the 3rd millennium, and a 5 MW solar trough system at the University of Arizona Solar Tech Park project which was completed in 2011. The 280 MW Solano Generating Station is under construction. The 1.5 MW Maricopa Solar Power Plant completed in 2010, using Stirling dish technology, was decommissioned in September 2011 and sold at auction on April 17, 2012 to CondiSys Solar Technology of China, for $250,000.

In 2008 Governor Janet Napolitano said that Arizona had the potential to become "the Persian Gulf of solar energy". In 2012, the NREL determined that Arizona has the potential to install 5,147 GW of photovoltaic power plants, and/or up to 3,528 GW of concentrated solar power plants (CSP), sufficient to generate more than three times total US consumption in 2012. According to a study by the Solar Energy Industries Association (SEIA) and GTM Research, Arizona installed over 55 megawatts of solar power in 2010, doubling its 2009 increase of 21 MW, ranking it behind California (259 MW), New Jersey (137 MW), Florida (110 MW), and Nevada (61 MW). By the end of 2011, Arizona had installed 383 MW of photovoltaics, in third place, behind New Jersey, and California.

In 2012 the first 100 MW of the Agua Caliente Solar Project was connected to the grid, making it the largest photovoltaic power plant in North America, and third largest in the world, being slightly larger than the 97 MW Sarnia Photovoltaic Power Plant. By July over 200 MW had been completed, making it the largest photovoltaic power plant in the world. By September 2012, 250 MW (AC) had been completed.

In January 2013, 150 MW of the 700 MW Mesquite Solar project photovoltaic power plant was completed. , 19 projects, with a total nameplate capacity of 13.45 gigawatts (GW) were seeking permission to build on federally owned BLM land in Arizona, and one, the 300 MW Sonoran Solar Project was approved, but the project fell through and not developed.

The Solana Generating Station completed testing in October 2013. The 280 MW parabolic trough solar plant is the largest plant of its type in the world. Solana includes 6 hours of power storage by molten salt. The plant will provide 5% of the power for Arizona Public Service, the state's largest utility.

Historically, Arizona has had one of the most successful solar incentive programs in the United States. However, as of February, 2013, the Arizona Corporation Commission has completely eliminated commercial incentives and has severely reduced the amount of residential incentives available. Still, some of the country's largest solar providers continue to do business in the state, including the largest solar contractor in the US, First Solar.

Community solar farms

Arizona has two community solar farms. Tucson Electric Power has a 1.6 MW community solar farm southeast of Tucson. Consumers can purchase 150 kWh for about $3/month. The 227 kW Trico Sun Farm in Marana allows Trico customers to purchase solar panels in one quarter increments for $920, and receive a credit of the output, about 36 kWh, each month for 20 years, worth about $5. Customers can purchase up to their average usage for the last 12 months, up to 10,000 watts.

Statistics

Capacity

Generation

(*) Preliminary data from Electric Power Monthly.
(**) Data from Solar Energy Industries Association.

Beginning with the 2014 data year,  Energy Information Administration has estimated distributed solar photovoltaic generation and distributed solar photovoltaic capacity. These non-utility scale estimates project that, Arizona generated the following additional solar energy.

Large solar farms

Proposed

Net metering
As of June 2021, Arizona was served primarily by Arizona Public Service company, Tucson Electric Power and UniSource Energy Services.

As of October 16, 2008, Arizona has one of the most consumer-friendly net metering laws in the country. Excess generation is rolled over month to month, and any surplus is returned annually to the consumer at the avoided cost rate. IREC best practices, based on experience, recommends perpetual roll over of kWh credits. Arizona had 642 MW of rooftop solar in 2015.  Historically, the states' utilities have led repeated, failed efforts to eliminate net metering. But after a year of wrangling with the solar industry, the Arizona Corporation Commission (ACC) decided in December 2016 to lower net-metering reimbursement rates significantly, leading to a temporary lull in rooftop solar installations because the lower rates made solar installations less economical for most residential and commercial installations.

Behind the scenes, however, Arizona Public Service negotiated a settlement with the solar industry in March 2017, which is still pending official approval from the ACC. In July, Administrative Law Judge Teena Jibilian gave the agreement a boost when she recommended, in a more than 427-page statement, that the ACC approve the deal. In September 2018, 
Tucson Electric introduced a new solar export program for homeowners.

Renewable Portfolio Standard

The Arizona Renewable Portfolio Standard calls for 15% renewable energy by 2025, and 4.5% (30% of that) from distributed generation from renewable sources. Renewable Energy Certificates (RECs), may be purchased to meet the requirement.

Arizona Solar Business Directory
The Arizona Solar Business Directory contains almost 100 solar installation companies that do business in Arizona and is maintained by the Arizona Solar Power Society.  The business directory allows consumers and commercial customers to contact a number of different companies to get the best deal and best performing products in the solar industry.

Arizona Solar Watchdog Program
The purpose of the Arizona Solar Watchdog Program is to teach consumers how to check a solar installation contractor's license, credentials and work history. Every contractor in Arizona needs to be registered with the Arizona Registrar of Contractors (ROC).  Each contractor is issued a Registrar of Contractors' license number, which can be looked up using the step-by-step process outlined under the Arizona Solar Watchdog Program.

See also

Wind power in Arizona
Solar power in the United States
Renewable energy in the United States

References

External links

Arizona Goes Solar
Arizona Solar Center
Arizona Solar Energy Association (ASEA)
Arizona Solar Energy Industries Association (AriSEIA)
Arizona Governor's Office of Energy Policy (replaces the AZ Dept. of Commerce Energy Office)
Renewable portfolio
Renewable generation report

Energy in Arizona
Arizona
Solar power in Arizona